Chok Sabz Ali is a village in Mamulan District, Pol-e Dokhtar County, Lorestan Province, Iran.

References 

Towns and villages in Pol-e Dokhtar County